Synanthedon spheciformis, the white-barred clearwing, is a moth of the family Sesiidae. It is found in Europe and Siberia.

The wingspan is 26–31 mm. The length of the forewings is 12–14 mm. The moth flies from May to June depending on the location.

The larvae feed on alder and birch. They bore the stem of their host plant.

Gallery

External links
Vlindernet 
waarneming.nl 
Lepidoptera of Belgium
White-barred Clearwing at UK Moths

Sesiidae
Moths described in 1775
Moths of Europe